Revue Illustrée (French: Illustrated Magazine) was a French language biweekly arts magazine which was published between 1885 and 1912 in Paris, France.

History and profile
Revue Illustrée was founded by Ludovic Baschet, an art gallery owner, and was first published on 5 December 1885 as a biweekly. It was based in Paris and directed by F. G. Dumas. From 1889 to 1904 Ludovic's son, René, edited the magazine, which targeted middle class readers and had high levels of circulation. The contributors included André Cahard, Henri Bellery-Desfontaines, Manuel Orazi and Carlos Schwabe. The literary and artistic direction was initially entrusted to the journalist and art editor François-Guillaume Dumas (1847-1919), who had already written several museum guides for the Baschet publishing house and who contributed to their weekly magazine Paris illustré. The magazine folded in 1912.

References

External links

1885 establishments in France
1912 disestablishments in France
Biweekly magazines published in France
French art publications
French-language magazines
Magazines established in 1885
Magazines disestablished in 1912
Magazines published in Paris